Serankulam or Serangulam or Serangolam, is a village in Mannargudi Taluk of Thiruvarur District in Tamil Nadu in India.

Serangolam is about 5 kilometers from Mannargudi and can be reached by buses, auto-rickshaws and a mini-bus. Serangolam is roughly about 330 kilometers from Chennai.

Religious Significance
In the Tamil Srivaishnava tradition, Serangolam (aka, Serankulam, Serangulam) is one of five villages collectively known as Panchagramam. The other villages are Karappangadu, Nammankurichi, Peravoorani and Puliyakkudi (Idaikkadu).

Oral tradition about Panchagramam
Once upon a time, a group of Srivaishnavas from Kooram, Kidambi and Selperi (near Kanchipuram) set off on a pilgrimage. One nightfall, they stopped at the place now known as Karappangadu. That night, they had a dream in which the Lord directed them to an anthill (marked by a flying Garuda) in which they were to find a deity. The Lord directed the Srivaishnavas to build a temple and chant the Divya Prabhandam for HIM. Thus, the town of Karappangadu was formed. As days went by, the families from Karappangadu settled in the near-by areas. They got settled in Peraavoorani, Nammankurichi, Puliyakkudi, and Serangolam - these came to be called "The Panchagramams" (meaning: "The 5 villages") along with Karappangaadu.

Temple

Serangolam has a temple dedicated to Lord Srinivasa, located on the banks of the river Paamani, a branch of Cauvery until it unites with Bay of Bengal in the town of Muthupettai.

References

Vaishnavism